Tamil Nadu Government Organisations are the commercial and non-commercial establishments in the Indian state of Tamil Nadu by Government of Tamil Nadu. This includes the state-run PSUs, Statutory corporations and co-operative societies. These commercial institutions are vital to the economic growth of this state. They generated a revenue of ₹425350.7 million for the fiscal year 2008–09. Following is the list of various governmental agencies of the state.

Preface 

Tamil Nadu Government Organisations are different types & under the control of different departments as follows:
 Public Sector Undertaking (PSU) registered under the Companies Act, 1956 
 Apex cooperative societies registered under the Tamil Nadu Societies Registration Act, 1975
 Statutory corporation incorporated and running as per Tamil Nadu Government's Act, Regulations, Rules

Working organisations

Agriculture and allied sectors

Community welfare

Labour and employment

Energy

Finance

Food and co-operation

Forestry

Industrial promotion

Industries

Infrastructure

Medicine

Rural industries

Textiles

Transport

Others

Defunct organisations

See also 
 Government of Tamil Nadu
 Tamil Nadu Government's Departments
 Government of India
 List of Indian agencies
 List of public sector undertakings in India
 List of government-owned companies
 Public sector undertakings in Kerala
 List of Kerala State Government Organizations
 Tamil Nadu Government Laws & Rules

References

External links 
 Government of Tamil Nadu – Official Website

 
Governmental organisations
Tamil Nadu
Agencies
Tamil Nadu